Monte Raione is a mountain of Campania, Italy. It has an elevation of 1,014 metres above sea level.

Sources

Mountains of Campania
Mountains of the Apennines